The 2018 Colts Neck mansion killings and arson took place on November 20, 2018, at a mansion home in Colts Neck Township, New Jersey. The four victims were identified by authorities as Keith Caneiro, Jennifer Caneiro, and their two children, Jesse, 11, and Sophia, 8. Firefighters from fire departments all over Monmouth County responded to the massive fire that was lit after the killings. Earlier in the day, firefighters responded to another fire at the house of Paul Caneiro, Keith's brother, in Ocean Township, New Jersey. Emergency personnel responded to this fire at approximately 5:01 am.

Killings
Keith Caneiro's body was found outside of the house with four gunshot wounds to the head and one to the torso. Jennifer's, Jesse's, and Sophia's bodies were found inside the house. Authorities believe that their bodies suffered homicidal violence before they were burned by the fire.

Alleged charges 
Police took Paul Caneiro into custody on November 21, 2018, without incident. He was charged with one count of aggravated arson on his own home while family members were inside. Authorities have stated that all four people living in Paul's house were able to escape the fire. His initial detention hearing was scheduled for November 28, 2018.

On November 29, 2018, authorities announced that seven more charges had been filed against Paul Caneiro. Caneiro was charged with four counts of first-degree murder, one count of aggravated arson, one count of possession of a firearm for an unlawful purpose, and one count of possession of a knife for an unlawful purpose, all in connection with the Colts Neck incident. Authorities also announced that his detention hearing for the first aggravated arson charge had been postponed until November 30, 2018. In addition, a detention hearing for the new charges was scheduled for December 4, 2018.

In July 2019, charges of insurance fraud were levied.

Defense
Caneiro pleaded not guilty at his brief court appearance for the initial aggravated arson charge on November 30, 2018.

According an affidavit unsealed Monday, February 25, 2019, Paul Caneiro was being cut-off financially from a joint business after funds had gone missing.

In March, attorneys representing Caneiro withdrew from the case after finding what they described as conflicts of interest, leaving the possibility that he would be represented by a public defender.

References

2018 crimes in New Jersey
Arson in New Jersey
Colts Neck Township, New Jersey
Familicides
Mass murder in 2018
November 2018 crimes in the United States
November 2018 events in the United States